Gruendler Glacier is a tributary glacier that drains the northern slopes of the Malta Plateau near Mount Hussey and flows north into Trainer Glacier, in the Victory Mountains of Victoria Land, Antarctica. It was mapped by the United States Geological Survey from surveys and U.S. Navy air photos, 1960–64, and was named by the Advisory Committee on Antarctic Names for James D. Gruendler, a member of the United States Antarctic Research Program glaciological party to Roosevelt Island, 1967–68.

References

Glaciers of Victoria Land
Borchgrevink Coast